The Welsh Congregational Church was a historic church in Youngstown, Ohio, United States.  Formed by some of Youngstown's large Welsh American community, it was once the center of Welsh life in Youngstown, and it has been designated a historic site. Despite efforts to preserve the church, the Catholic Diocese of Youngstown demolished it on April 28, 2022 after decades of abandonment.

During the middle and late nineteenth century, Youngstown began to develop as an industrial powerhouse, and its population expanded with the arrival of thousands of western European immigrants.  The largest ethnic group was Welsh, many of whom came to work in coal mines at Brier Hill, west of the city.  Some of the Welshmen founded a Congregational church at Brier Hill in 1845, but significant growth prompted the members to construct a new building in Youngstown itself, near downtown, in 1861.  This building, the present structure, soon became an ethnic community center as well as a house of worship.  Major reconstruction was performed on the building in 1887, completely changing its architectural style.  Few other alterations were made over the next century, and by the 1980s, it was Youngstown's oldest church and the only frame house of worship without recent modifications.

One and a half stories tall, the church is composed of weatherboarded and shingled walls and an asbestos roof, set upon a stone foundation.  It was originally a Greek Revival structure, although the Queen Anne style has dominated since 1887.  The floor plan is vaguely cruciform, with the arms placed so near the street that they appear to form the facade, and the top of the cross protrudes only a slight distance from the arms.  All sections are gable-roofed.  Small dormer windows are placed in the arm roofs, and a polygonal tower with a steep roof sits atop the facade.

In 1986, the Welsh Congregational Church was listed on the National Register of Historic Places, qualifying both because of its historically significant architecture and because of its place in community history.  It was part of a multiple property submission of downtown-area buildings, along with numerous commercial buildings, the Masonic Temple, and First Presbyterian Church.  By this time, it was no longer occupied by its original owners, having become home instead to the Messiah Holiness Church.

By the late 2010s, the church had been left in a state of disrepair. Many efforts were made by locals to relocate the church to nearby sites such as Wick Park and "The Wedge" in Downtown, however these efforts ultimately failed. Discouraged by the lengthy timeline of relocation and renovation plans, the Catholic Diocese of Youngstown decided to have the building demolished in order to make way for a new green space where the church once stood. On April 28, 2022, the church was demolished after standing for 161 years.

References

1845 establishments in Ohio
Religious organizations established in 1845
Churches completed in 1861
Congregational organizations established in the 19th century
Churches in Mahoning County, Ohio
Congregational churches in Ohio
Greek Revival church buildings in Ohio
National Register of Historic Places in Mahoning County, Ohio
Queen Anne architecture in Ohio
Welsh-American culture in Ohio
Wooden churches in the United States
Churches in Youngstown, Ohio